Magleby is a surname. Notable people with the surname include:

Alexander Magleby (born 1978), American rugby union player and coach
Christian Magleby (born 1977), Danish footballer
David Magleby (born 1949), American political scientist
Frank Magleby (1928-2013), American painter and educator

Surnames of Danish origin